Division 2 Sydsvenska Serien 1920–21 was part of the 1920–21 Swedish football season.

League table

References
 

2
Sweden2